The Bursa (Pigeon) is a breed of fancy pigeon. Bursa Pigeons, along with other varieties of domesticated pigeons, are all descendants from the rock pigeon (Columba livia).

See also 
List of pigeon breeds

Pigeon breeds